Cooper Creek is a river in Australia.

Cooper Creek may also refer to:

Cooper Creek (Toccoa River tributary), a stream in Georgia, US
Cooper Creek (Deepwater Creek), a stream in Missouri
Cooper Creek (New York), a river in Otsego County
Cooper Creek, an area that was mined for gold, in Cooper Landing, Alaska